Moon Joo-Won (born May 8, 1983) is a South Korean football player.  He currently plays for Gyeongnam FC

Club career

Moon made his professional debut for Daegu FC, having joined the club for the 2007 season.  Moon would stay for three seasons, before transferring to newly formed K-League club Gangwon FC in January 2010.

In January 2011, Moon moved to Japanese club Sagan Tosu, who play in the J2 League. On June 30, 2012, he was released from Sagan Tosu and is now a free agent.

Club statistics

References

External links

 

1983 births
Living people
Association football midfielders
South Korean footballers
South Korean expatriate footballers
Daegu FC players
Gangwon FC players
Sagan Tosu players
Gyeongnam FC players
K League 1 players
J2 League players
K League 2 players
Expatriate footballers in Japan
South Korean expatriate sportspeople in Japan
Kyung Hee University alumni